Peder Persson (13 November 1938 – 17 February 2018) was a Swedish footballer who played as a forward. Persson was part of the Djurgården IF Allsvenskan-winning teams of 1964 and 1966.

Persson was born in Hova, Sweden, and played for BK Forward and Örebro SK before joining Djurgården in 1964. He made 57 Allsvenskan appearances for Djurgården and scored 24 goals.

Persson died on 17 February 2018.

Honours
Djurgårdens IF
 Allsvenskan: 1964, 1966

References

1938 births
2018 deaths
People from Gullspång Municipality
Association football forwards
Swedish footballers
BK Forward players
Örebro SK players
Djurgårdens IF Fotboll players
Allsvenskan players
Sportspeople from Västra Götaland County